is a 1985 Japanese film directed by Yoshimitsu Morita, based on the novel by Natsume Sōseki.

Cast

Awards and nominations
7th Yokohama Film Festival 
: Best Music Score - Shigeru Umebayashi
6th Best Film

References

External links
 
 

1985 films
Films directed by Yoshimitsu Morita
1980s Japanese-language films
Best Film Kinema Junpo Award winners
1980s Japanese films

ja:それから#映画